Chhota Udaipur district is a district in the state of Gujarat in India. It was carved out of the Vadodara district on 26 January 2013 with its headquarters at Chhota Udaipur town and is the 28th district of Gujarat.

Establishment
The district consists of the six talukas of Chhota Udaipur, Jetpur Pavi, Kawant, Naswadi, Sankheda and the newly created Bodeli taluka. The district headquarters is located at Chhota Udaipur.

The district was created to facilitate decentralisation and ease of access to government services. Its creation, announced in the run up to the Assembly elections in Gujarat in 2012, was also seen by the media and political analysts as a government strategy to attract tribal votes.

History 
Chhota Udaipur shares its borders with the state of Madhya Pradesh. Chhota Udaipur district has a forest area of 75,704 hectares and has deposits of dolomite, fluorite, granite and sand all of which are mined. The district is also home to a large dairy industry.

Chhota Udaipur is a tribal dominated district, and the district headquarters is located 110 km away from Vadodara. Chhota Udaipur is the third tribal dominated district in eastern Gujarat after the Narmada and Tapi districts.

Chhota Udaipur, once a princely state of Gujarat lies in the heart of a tribal area with rich indigenous history and culture which is more representative of the region than palaces. The town is a good base from which to explore the surrounding tribal villages, particularly in the Rathwa communities. The Rathwa tribals who live here produce the Pithora mural paintings by mixing colours with liquor and milk and then using it to depict intricate motifs and scenes on the walls of their village dwellings. The Tribal Museum here displays a nice collection of people and culture of this place. Every Saturday there is a tribal market which is a hub for local artisans making pithoda paintings and terracotta horses.

Chhota Udaipur town sits on the edge of a big lake, with a series of temples along the skyline. Structures from the 1920s such as the Kusum Vilas Palace (now a heritage hotel) and Prem Bhavan are also worth visiting, though they need permission from the local royal family. The Kali Niketan (Nahar Mahal) palace, built as the summer residence of the erstwhile royal family is a notable monument in Chhota Udaipur. The Jain temple is an interesting example of the influence of Victorian art on local building styles, which is otherwise rare display in traditional Jain buildings elsewhere.

Administration 
This district has been divided into a total of 6 taluks. 

 Chhota Udaipur
 Navsadi
 Sankheda
 Bodeli
 Jetpur Pavi
 quant

The number of seats in Chotaudepur Taluka Panchayat was increased from 23 to 26 in the delimitation of 4 taluka panchayats of Chotaudepur district which was published in June 2015 by Gujarat State Election Commission Secretary Mahesh Joshi. The number of seats in Naswadi taluka panchayat was increased from 17 to 22 and the number of seats in Navarchit Bodeli taluka panchayat was fixed at 26, while the number of seats in Sankheda taluka panchayat was reduced from 23 to 18. 

A population of 2,15,590 of the taluka has been taken into consideration for the formation of Chotaudepur Taluka Panchayat. A census of 1,55,543 of the taluk has been taken for the formation of Naswadi Taluka Panchayat. Whereas for Sankheda taluka panchayat the population of taluka is 1,05,952 and for Bodeli taluka panchayat the population of taluka is 1,83,850.

Demographics 
Chhota Udaipur has a population of 1,071,831, of which 72,415 (6.76%) lived in urban areas. The district had a sex ratio of 967 females per 1000 males. Scheduled Castes and Scheduled Tribes made up 25,279 (2.36%) and 856,862 (79.94%) of the population respectively.

Hindus are 1,035,085 while Muslims are 34,222.

At the time of the 2011 census 98.46% of the population spoke Gujarati and 1.05% Hindi as their first language.

Politics
  

|}

See also
Chhota Udaipur State

References

External links

 Official website

 
Districts of Gujarat
2013 establishments in Gujarat